Gameplay was a Russian language magazine about video games, published in Ukraine by ITC Publishing since August 2005. Its circulation (as for September 2009) was 20 000. It ceased publication in June 2010.

Staff 
Notable writers for the magazine include Editor-in-Chief Serhiy Halyonkin (often referred as Segal), editors Anna Zinchenko and Alina Zhigunova, authors Oleg Ovsienko, Mikhail Zinchenko, Yaroslav Singayevsky and Igor Klimovsky.

Magazine content
Gameplay is best known for its "Evolution of genres" series of articles, that describes history and evolution of computer and video games for past 30 years.

Each April issue carries a theme "Our games" and writes about most game developers studios, situated in Ukraine.

Also, Gameplay publishes previews, reviews, interviews and such - as most of gaming press do.

Controversy
Some readers note that Gameplay gives a lot of attention to video games, sometimes giving a console games a higher score than to PC games. But editorial boards say that it is because of higher popularity of PC games in Ukraine, which sometimes is credited to higher level of piracy.

External links
http://gameplay.com.ua - official website for Gameplay magazine (in Russian)

2005 establishments in Ukraine
2010 disestablishments in Ukraine
Magazines established in 2005
Magazines disestablished in 2010
Defunct magazines published in Ukraine
Russian-language video game magazines
Magazines published in Ukraine